In the 2015–16 season, MC El Eulma is competing in the Ligue 2 for the 8th season, as well as the Algerian Cup. They will be competing in Ligue 1, and the Algerian Cup.

Competitions

Overview

Ligue 2

League table

Results summary

Results by round

Matches

Algerian Cup

Champions League

Group stage

Group B

Squad information

Playing statistics

|-
! colspan=12 style=background:#dcdcdc; text-align:center| Goalkeepers

|-
! colspan=12 style=background:#dcdcdc; text-align:center| Defenders

|-
! colspan=12 style=background:#dcdcdc; text-align:center| Midfielders

|-
! colspan=12 style=background:#dcdcdc; text-align:center| Forwards

|-
! colspan=12 style=background:#dcdcdc; text-align:center| Players transferred out during the season

Goalscorers
Includes all competitive matches. The list is sorted alphabetically by surname when total goals are equal.

Transfers

In

Out

References

MC El Eulma seasons
Algerian football clubs 2015–16 season